George Stewart (1885–1955) was a notable New Zealand wool and fur skin exporter, businessman. He was born in Dunedin, New Zealand in 1885.

References

1885 births
1955 deaths
20th-century New Zealand businesspeople
Businesspeople from Dunedin